Mike Jimenez (born May 15, 1987) is an American professional boxer in the Super Middleweight division.  Jimenez fought Jesse Hart for the USBA Super Middleweight title on the undercard of Mayweather-Pacquiao.

References

External links
 

1987 births
Living people
American male boxers
Super-middleweight boxers